Béatrice Leca (born 1970 in Paris) is a contemporary French writer, winner of the 1996 edition of the Prix Fénéon.

Publications 
1996: Technique du marbre, Éditions du Seuil, Prix Fénéon
1999: Des années encore, Seuil
2004: Aux bords des forêts, Melville

External links 
 Béatrice Leca on France Culture
 Technique du marbre by Béatrice Leca on the site of éditions du Seuil
 Béatrice Leca podcasts on Babelio

1970 births
Living people
20th-century French non-fiction writers
21st-century French non-fiction writers
20th-century French women writers
21st-century French women writers
Prix Fénéon winners
Writers from Paris